Carlito Marquez (born July 21, 1942) is a Filipino politician. He currently serves as a member of the Philippine House of Representatives representing the 1st District of Aklan.

Political career 
In 2016, Lito was elected as Representative of the Lone District of Aklan. During his term as Legislator, one local law was passed entitled Republic Act 11077; An Act Reapportioning the Province of Aklan into Two Legislative District. Lito was the incumbent representative of Aklan from First District. Year 2013, during his last term as the Governor of Aklan, he decided to run as the Kasangga Party-list as first nominee in 2013 Election. In 2016, he is the biggest election spenders in Aklan. He led the unveiling of the two buildings of Agricultural Training Institute in Region 6 along with Dr. Glenn B. Gregorio, Executive Director of Southeast Asian Regional Center for Graduate Study and Research in Agriculture (SEARCA); Dr. Danilo E. Abayon, former University President of ASU; Dr. Arlene Flores, ATI Managers (ATIMA) President; Dr. Eden DLR. Bautista, Center Director of ATI Region 6; former Center Directors and Employees of the said center; Learning Site (LS) Cooperators; ASU Officials; and 4-H Club Regional Officers. In his message, Hon. Marquez expressed the contribution of agriculture sector in achieving progress in the province.

References

 

Living people
Governors of Aklan
Members of the House of Representatives of the Philippines from Aklan
Liberal Party (Philippines) politicians
Nationalist People's Coalition politicians
Kabalikat ng Malayang Pilipino politicians
1942 births